Anne-Marie Cadieux (born September 23, 1963) is a Canadian actress, film director and screenwriter. She has won a Jutra Award for Best Supporting Actress for her role in Streetheart (Le Cœur au poing) and in 2008 was nominated for a Genie Award for Best Performance by an Actress in a Leading Role for her role in You (Toi).

Early life 
Cadieux received her Bachelor of Arts in theatre from the University of Ottawa. She first appeared on stage in 1983 in Les Belles-Sœurs directed by Andre Brassard. Brassard would direct Cadieux again in L'Année de la grosse tempête in 1984 and Genet's Les Bonnes in 1985.

Career 
Anne-Marie Cadieux has stood out in Quebec and internationally for several years thanks to an active career in theatre, film and television. Onstage, she has worked with some of our most important directors, including Robert Lepage, Brigitte Haentjens, Denis Marleau, Serge Denoncourt, Dominic Champagne, Lorraine Pintal, and André Brassard, in addition to having held some of the greatest roles in the classical and contemporary repertoire. A popular actress with audiences and critics alike, Anne-Marie is known for her audacity, versatility and intensity, gracefully transitioning from drama to comedy. The prestigious honors she has received over the years illustrate her talent and commitment to the Quebec art scene.

In 2022, Cadieux played in Martin Villeneuve's The 12 Tasks of Imelda (Les 12 travaux d'Imelda), co-starring playwright Robert Lepage and actress-signer Ginette Reno, in which she plays Martin and Denis Villeneuve's aunt Diane.

Accomplishments 
 Nominated for Best Supporting Actress Genie for "Le Confessionnal" (1995)
 Won Best Supporting Actress Jutra for her role as a carping sister in "Le coeur au poing" (1998)
 Nominated for Best Actress Genie as a thespian caught in terrorist activities in "Nô" (1998)

Selected filmography

References

External links
 

1963 births
Actresses from Montreal
Actresses from Ottawa
Canadian film actresses
Canadian women film directors
Canadian screenwriters in French
Canadian television actresses
Film directors from Montreal
Film directors from Ottawa
Franco-Ontarian people
French Quebecers
Living people
Canadian women screenwriters
Writers from Montreal
Writers from Ottawa
Best Supporting Actress Jutra and Iris Award winners